HMS Kent was a 74-gun  third-rate ship of the line of the Royal Navy, designed by Sir Thomas Slade and built by Adam Hayes at Deptford Dockyard and launched on 23 March 1762 .

Service History
She was launched at a cost of £40,000.

The marine reportedly suffered no injuries as a result.
In 1775 Kent was briefly under the command of John Jervis.

She was sold out of the service at Plymouth in 1784 for £600.

Notable Commanders

Captain Robert Faulknor 1762/3
Captain Edward Vernon briefly in 1763
Captain Charles Fielding 1772 to 1775
Captain John Jervis briefly in 1775
Captain James Cook 1775

Notes

References

Lavery, Brian (2003) The Ship of the Line – Volume 1: The development of the battlefleet 1650–1850. Conway Maritime Press. .
Michael Phillips. Kent (74) (1762). Michael Phillips' Ships of the Old Navy. Retrieved 15 November 2008.

External links
 

Ships of the line of the Royal Navy
Bellona-class ships of the line
1762 ships
Non-combat internal explosions on warships